William James Steel (born 4 December 1959) is a Scottish former professional association footballer. A big, aggressive player, his position was centre forward.

After starting his career with Oldham Athletic in 1978, he moved onto Port Vale in March 1983 for a £10,000 fee, following loan spells at Wigan Athletic and Wrexham. He won promotion with the club in 1982–83, before he joined Wrexham for £10,000 in January 1984. He scored a critical goal in his two European campaigns during his four years with the club, and also lifted the Welsh Cup. After a brief spell on loan at Deportivo de La Coruña, he then enjoyed numerous successes with Tranmere Rovers after joining the club in 1987. During his five years the club won promotion twice, and reached the final of the Football League Trophy twice, winning it in 1990. He retired in 1992, having made 485 league appearances in a fourteen-year career in the Football League, scoring 118 goals.

Career

Oldham Athletic
Steel was born in Dumfries, and raised in nearby Dalbeattie. He began his football career when he was signed as an apprentice by Jimmy Frizzell for Oldham Athletic. After scoring two goals against Cardiff City on his debut, he established himself in the first team as the "Latics" battled away in the lower half of the Second Division table in 1978–79, 1979–80, 1980–81, and 1981–82. During his time he built successful strike partnership with Simon Stainrod and Rodger Wylde. Frizzell was dismissed in early 1982 and Steel was unable to establish himself under new manager Joe Royle. Steel had loans spells with Third Division clubs Wigan Athletic (scoring two goals in his two league games under Larry Lloyd) and Wrexham (where he scored six goals from his nine league games). Steel left Boundary Park in March 1983 after making 108 league appearances and scoring 24 goals.

Port Vale
Aged 23, Steel was bought by John McGrath at Port Vale for £10,000 in March 1983. He played in every game for the rest of that season as the club were promoted from the Fourth Division in third place. Vale struggled in the Third Division in the 1983–84 season, and Steel lost his place in the team in December, and McGrath lost his job.

Wrexham
The month after his 24th birthday, Steel returned to Wrexham (now in the Fourth Division) for £10,000 in January 1984. Of his non-loan moves this was his most prolific period in front of goal with 51 strikes in his 164 league games. Wrexham at the time could not afford the £10,000 transfer fee, but Steel joined the club after an interest-free loan was made to the club by David Wells, a Wrexham supporting businessman from Mold.

Following a Welsh Cup final defeat to Shrewsbury Town, Wrexham took on an F.C. Porto side of numerous Portuguese internationals in the 1984–85 European Cup Winners' Cup (Shrewsbury as an English club could not represent Wales in European competition). Wrexham won the opening leg at the Racecourse Ground 1–0, courtesy of a goal from Steel. He had taken the ball on his chest in the centre circle with his back to goal, volleyed the dropping ball for John Muldoon to attack and cross from the right wing into the penalty area, and then jumped to direct a bullet header past Petar Borota. In the second leg at Estádio das Antas, Porto were 3–0 up after 38 minutes. The Welsh club pulled two goals back before half-time. In the 61st minute Paulo Futre restored Porto's aggregate lead before Wrexham's last minute strike meant the tie finished level at 4–4, with Wrexham advancing on away goals.

The second round draw paired Wrexham with the previous season's European Cup runners up, A.S. Roma, managed by Sven-Göran Eriksson. Wrexham lost 3–0 on aggregate over the two legs. Steel said of the adventure, "We went to Porto and there was a bloody hurricane. We come to Rome and the bloody shops are shut. When we play in Russia, Reagan will probably have the place blown up."

With Steel scoring both goals in a Welsh Cup final replay 2–1 win over Kidderminster Harriers, the "Dragons" appeared in the 1986–87 European Cup Winners' Cup with a first round draw against Maltese side Żurrieq, whom they beat 7–0 on aggregate. Steel scored in Wrexham in the second leg. This earned a second round tie against Real Zaragoza, which brought two goalless draws. At home in extra-time in the second leg Wrexham matched the two goals by Patricio Yáñez to level the fixture at 2–2. However, on this occasion away-goals counted against Steel's side.

With the Spanish league extended into the summer, Steel was allowed to go out on loan at Deportivo de La Coruña at the end of the 1986–87 season. He featured in four Segunda División games at Estadio Riazor, as Eusebio Ríos's side made an unsuccessful bid for promotion into La Liga.

Tranmere Rovers
Steel, now aged 27, moved on to Tranmere Rovers in late 1987. He moved for a then club record transfer fee, with manager Johnny King looking to use Steel to act as target man for striker Ian Muir. They enjoyed considerable success together in the seasons to follow.

At the end of the 1987–88 season, Tranmere played at Wembley in the 16 team Football League Centenary Tournament. A good mid-season run of form saw Rovers qualify as one of the Fourth Division's two representatives. Tranmere were the surprise package of an otherwise derided tournament, beating First Division sides Wimbledon and Newcastle United before losing on penalties to eventual winners Nottingham Forest in the semi-final. This became the first of five trips to Wembley for Tranmere in Steel's time at Prenton Park.

Tranmere won promotion as Fourth Division runners-up in 1988–89. In the same season Rovers knocked First Division Middlesbrough out of the League Cup. Rovers also went on to knock top-flight Millwall out of the same competition in 1989–90. Steel scored with a massive looping header against the Tottenham Hotspur side of Gary Lineker and Paul Gascoigne in a 2–2 draw in the next round to earn a replay. In October 1991 another top-flight team, Chelsea, took a League Cup exit at Prenton Park when they lost 3–1.

In their first season in the Third Division, 1989–90, Rovers earned a place in the play-offs after finishing in fourth place. They went on to lose 2–0 to Notts County in the play-off final at Wembley Stadium. A week later at the Twin Towers Rovers defeated Third Division champions, Bristol Rovers, 2–1 in the final of the Football League Trophy – this was Tranmere's first national piece of silverware. Club record scorer Ian Muir gave Tranmere an early lead with a volleyed strike. Devon White gave Bristol Rovers an equaliser early in the second half, before Steel headed a late winner.

Tranmere Rovers went one better in the 1990–91 season, winning the Third Division play-offs with a 1–0 win over Bolton Wanderers after a fifth-place finish. Chris Malkin's extra time goal helped the club to promotion to the Second Division for the first time since the 1930s. Once again, Rovers made an appearance in the Football League Trophy Final, this time losing 3–2 to Birmingham City, with Steel again on the scoresheet. This made the play-off victory over Bolton Tranmere's fourth appearance in a Wembley final in just over a year.

The 1991 promotion meant Steel played his last season at the level at which he began his senior career, England's second tier. Rovers finished their first season back at this level, 1991–92, comfortably in mid-table. In total, Steel scored 29 goals in 174 Tranmere league games, before he retired from professional football at the age of 32.

After football
Steel left football to start a career with the Merseyside Police force.

Career statistics
Source:

Honours
Port Vale
 Football League Fourth Division third-place promotion: 1982–83
Wrexham
 Welsh Cup: 1986
Tranmere Rovers
 Football League Fourth Division second-place promotion: 1988–89
 Football League Third Division play-offs: 1991
 Football League Trophy: 1990; runner-up: 1991

References

1959 births
Living people
People from Dalbeattie
Footballers from Dumfries
Scottish footballers
Association football forwards
Oldham Athletic A.F.C. players
Wigan Athletic F.C. players
Wrexham A.F.C. players
Scottish expatriate footballers
Scottish expatriate sportspeople in Spain
Expatriate footballers in Spain
Deportivo de La Coruña players
Port Vale F.C. players
Tranmere Rovers F.C. players
English Football League players
Segunda División players